Patrick Philip "Woody" Woods-Scawen  (29 June 19161 September 1940) was a Royal Air Force officer who flew during the Battle of Britain and as such was one of "The Few".

Early life
Woods-Scawen was born on 29 June 1916 in Karachi, India, the son of Philip Neri and Kathleen Florence Woods-Scawen.  He and his younger brother Tony returned to the family home in Farnborough, Hampshire in 1924.  He was educated at the Salesian College, Farnborough.

Royal Air Force
Woods-Scawen joined the Royal Air Force on a short service commission in October 1937. He was posted to No. 11 Flying Training School at RAF Wittering on 9 January 1938 and joined No. 85 Squadron RAF at RAF Debden on 20 August. He went to France with the squadron at the outbreak of war. On 10 May 1940, Woods-Scawen destroyed a Henschel Hs 126 and shared a Junkers Ju 88, on 11 May shared a Dornier Do 17, on 17 May destroyed a Messerschmitt Bf 109 and on 19 May destroyed three more and probably a fourth. The squadron withdrew to RAF Debden on 22 May. He was promoted to the rank of flying officer on 25 May 1940.

Woods-Scawen was awarded the Distinguished Flying Cross (gazetted 25 June 1940). The citation reads:
During May 1940, this officer destroyed six enemy aircraft and assisted in the destruction of others. On one occasion, although heavily outnumbered, he attacked without hesitation a large formation of enemy aircraft, shooting down two of them. His own aircraft was hit by a cannon shell and he was slightly wounded, but succeeded in escaping by parachute and rejoining his unit. He has displayed great courage, endurance and leadership.

On 29 July, Woods-Scawen damaged a Dornier Do 17 forty miles east of Felixstowe and had his own aircraft damaged by return fire. He claimed a Bf 109 probably destroyed and a Do 17 shared on 26 August, a Bf 109 destroyed on 28 August, a Messerschmitt Bf 110 on 30 August and three Bf 109s on 31 August.

Woods-Scawen was shot down in combat with Bf 109s in the Kenley area on 1 September 1940. He bailed out but was killed when his parachute failed. His body was not found until 6 September in the grounds of The Ivies, Kenley Lane.  His younger brother Tony serving with No. 43 Squadron RAF was killed the day after him on 2 September 1940.

Woods-Scawen is buried in St Mary's churchyard, Caterham on the Hill, Surrey.

References

1916 births
1940 deaths
British World War II pilots
British World War II fighter pilots
Royal Air Force officers
The Few
Aviators killed by being shot down
Royal Air Force personnel killed in World War II
People educated at Salesian College, Farnborough
Recipients of the Distinguished Flying Cross (United Kingdom)
Aviators killed in aviation accidents or incidents in England
Victims of aviation accidents or incidents in 1940
Military personnel from Karachi
Military personnel of British India